Mark Andrew Arber (born 9 October 1977) is an English former professional footballer who played as a centre-back or left-back. He began his career in 1996 with Tottenham Hotspur, and retired in 2014 after a short stay at Corby Town. Following his retirement from playing, Arber moved into coaching, and previously served as an academy coach at Arsenal.

Career
Arber began his career with Tottenham Hotspur in 1996; he made no appearances in the first team prior to him leaving in 1998, being sent out on loan to Barnet that year, where he made eight league appearances.

Following his release by Tottenham he signed for Barnet on a permanent contract and became a regular in the first-team squad, making 197 appearances and scoring 25 goals between 1998 and 2002, when he joined Peterborough United.

At Peterborough, Arber was again a regular in the side, making 75 appearances and scoring 5 goals prior to a short stint with Oldham Athletic in 2004. At Oldham, he played only 17 times, scoring one goal.

After his time at Oldham ended, Arber rejoined Peterborough and between 2005 and 2007 he made 117 appearances, scoring four goals. Near the end of his second spell at Peterborough, in 2007, he went out on loan to Dagenham & Redbridge, playing six times.

He left Peterborough once more in June 2007 and joined Stevenage Borough on a free transfer; at Stevenage, Arber made 32 appearances, scoring 5 goals.

On 12 February 2008, Arber rejoined Dagenham & Redbridge on loan until the end of the 2007–08 season. At the end of the season Arber signed for Dagenham on a permanent basis. He soon became captain of the side, leading them to a 3–2 victory over Rotherham United in the League Two play-off final in May 2010.

In May 2012, after making 163 appearances and scoring 11 goals, Arber was released by Dagenham upon the expiry of his contract. Subsequently, Arber signed for Blue Square Bet Premier newcomers Dartford in late July 2012.

Arber had a constant place in the Dartford starting line up in the beginning of the 2012–13 season. However, on 17 November 2012, he fractured his jaw in a 2–2 draw home to Southport. Uncertain of this, he continued playing, going to the lengths of making a tackle with his head. It was confirmed at East Grinstead Hospital that he would be out for three to four weeks. He was released by Dartford at the end of the season.

In June 2013, he joined Corby Town as player-coach. He also started coaching at the Arsenal academy until he placed a bet on Mesut Ozil joining Arsenal, tweeting "Lovely bit of 14–1 Mesut'" and was subsequently released. In January 2014, Arber joined United Counties League Premier Division side Huntingdon Town on loan until the end of the season.

Personal life 
Arber is the son of former footballer Bobby Arber.

Career statistics

References

External links

1977 births
English footballers
Living people
Association football defenders
Tottenham Hotspur F.C. players
Barnet F.C. players
Peterborough United F.C. players
Oldham Athletic A.F.C. players
Dagenham & Redbridge F.C. players
Stevenage F.C. players
Dartford F.C. players
Corby Town F.C. players
Huntingdon Town F.C. players
English Football League players
National League (English football) players
Southern Football League players
Sportspeople from Johannesburg